Pentaerythritol tetranitrate (PETN), also known as PENT, PENTA, (ПЕНТА, primarily in Russian) TEN, corpent, or penthrite (or, rarely and primarily in German, as nitropenta), is an explosive material. It is the nitrate ester of pentaerythritol, and is structurally very similar to nitroglycerin. Penta refers to the five carbon atoms of the neopentane skeleton. PETN is a very powerful explosive material with a relative effectiveness factor of 1.66. When mixed with a plasticizer, PETN forms a plastic explosive. Along with RDX it is the main ingredient of Semtex and C4.

PETN is also used as a vasodilator drug to treat certain heart conditions, such as for management of angina.

History
Pentaerythritol tetranitrate was first prepared and patented in 1894 by the explosives manufacturer Rheinisch-Westfälische Sprengstoff A.G. of Cologne, Germany. The production of PETN started in 1912, when the improved method of production was patented by the German government. It was also used in the MG FF/M autocannons and many other weapon systems of the Luftwaffe in World War II, specifically in the high explosive Mine shell.

Properties
PETN is practically insoluble in water (0.01 g/100 ml at 50 °C), weakly soluble in common nonpolar solvents such as aliphatic hydrocarbons (like gasoline) or tetrachloromethane, but soluble in some other organic solvents, particularly in acetone (about 15 g/100 g of the solution at 20 °C, 55 g/100 g at 60 °C) and dimethylformamide (40 g/100 g of the solution at 40 °C, 70 g/100 g at 70 °C). PETN forms eutectic mixtures with some liquid or molten aromatic nitro compounds, e.g. trinitrotoluene (TNT) or tetryl. Due to steric hindrance of the adjacent neopentyl-like moiety, PETN is resistant to attack by many chemical reagents; it does not hydrolyze in water at room temperature or in weaker alkaline aqueous solutions. Water at 100 °C or above causes hydrolysis to dinitrate; presence of 0.1% nitric acid accelerates the reaction.

The chemical stability of PETN is of interest, because of the presence of PETN in aging weapons. A review has been published. Neutron radiation degrades PETN, producing carbon dioxide and some pentaerythritol dinitrate and trinitrate. Gamma radiation increases the thermal decomposition sensitivity of PETN, lowers melting point by few degrees Celsius, and causes swelling of the samples. Like other nitrate esters, the primary degradation mechanism is the loss of nitrogen dioxide; this reaction is autocatalytic. Studies were performed on thermal decomposition of PETN.

In the environment, PETN undergoes biodegradation. Some bacteria denitrate PETN to trinitrate and then dinitrate, which is then further degraded. PETN has low volatility and low solubility in water, and therefore has low bioavailability for most organisms. Its toxicity is relatively low, and its transdermal absorption also seems to be low. It poses a threat for aquatic organisms. It can be degraded to pentaerythritol by iron.

Production

Production is by the reaction of pentaerythritol with concentrated nitric acid to form a precipitate which can be recrystallized from acetone to give processable crystals.

Variations of a method first published in US Patent 2,370,437 by Acken and Vyverberg (1945 to Du Pont) form the basis of all current commercial production.

PETN is manufactured by numerous manufacturers as a powder, or together with nitrocellulose and plasticizer as thin plasticized sheets (e.g. Primasheet 1000 or Detasheet). PETN residues are easily detectable in hair of people handling it. The highest residue retention is on black hair; some residues remain even after washing.

Explosive use

The most common use of PETN is as an explosive with high brisance. It is more difficult to detonate than primary explosives, so dropping or igniting it will typically not cause an explosion (at atmospheric pressure it is difficult to ignite and burns relatively slowly), but is more sensitive to shock and friction than other secondary explosives such as TNT or tetryl. Under certain conditions a deflagration to detonation transition can occur.

It is rarely used alone, but primarily used in booster and bursting charges of small caliber ammunition, in upper charges of detonators in some land mines and shells, and as the explosive core of detonation cord. PETN is the least stable of the common military explosives, but can be stored without significant deterioration for longer than nitroglycerin or nitrocellulose.

During World War II, PETN was most importantly used in exploding-bridgewire detonators for the atomic bombs. These exploding-bridgewire detonators gave more precise detonation, compared with primacord. PETN was used for these detonators because it was safer than primary explosives like lead azide: while it was sensitive, it would not detonate below a threshold amount of energy. Exploding bridgewires containing PETN remain used in current nuclear weapons. In spark detonators, PETN is used to avoid the need for primary explosives; the energy needed for a successful direct initiation of PETN by an electric spark ranges between 10–60 mJ.

Its basic explosion characteristics are:
 Explosion energy: 5810 kJ/kg (1390 kcal/kg), so 1 kg of PETN has the energy of 1.24 kg TNT.
 Detonation velocity: 8350 m/s (1.73 g/cm3), 7910 m/s (1.62 g/cm3), 7420 m/s (1.5 g/cm3), 8500 m/s (pressed in a steel tube)
 Volume of gases produced: 790 dm3/kg (other value: 768 dm3/kg)
 Explosion temperature: 4230 °C
 Oxygen balance: −6.31 atom -g/kg
 Melting point: 141.3 °C (pure), 140–141 °C (technical)
 Trauzl lead block test: 523 cm3 (other values: 500 cm3 when sealed with sand, or 560 cm3 when sealed with water)
 Critical diameter (minimal diameter of a rod that can sustain detonation propagation): 0.9 mm for PETN at 1 g/cm3, smaller for higher densities (other value: 1.5 mm)

In mixtures
PETN is used in a number of compositions. It is a major ingredient of the Semtex plastic explosive. It is also used as a component of pentolite, a 50/50 blend with TNT. The XTX8003 extrudable explosive, used in the W68 and W76 nuclear warheads, is a mixture of 80% PETN and 20% of Sylgard 182, a silicone rubber. It is often phlegmatized by addition of 5–40% of wax, or by polymers (producing polymer-bonded explosives); in this form it is used in some cannon shells up to 30 mm caliber, though it is unsuitable for higher calibers.  It is also used as a component of some gun propellants and solid rocket propellants. Nonphlegmatized PETN is stored and handled with approximately 10% water content. PETN alone cannot be cast as it explosively decomposes slightly above its melting point, but it can be mixed with other explosives to form castable mixtures.

PETN can be initiated by a laser. A pulse with duration of 25 nanoseconds and 0.5–4.2 joules of energy from a Q-switched ruby laser can initiate detonation of a PETN surface coated with a 100 nm thick aluminium layer in less than half of a microsecond.

PETN has been replaced in many applications by RDX, which is thermally more stable and has a longer shelf life. PETN can be used in some ram accelerator types. Replacement of the central carbon atom with silicon produces Si-PETN, which is extremely sensitive.

Terrorist use

Ten kilograms of PETN was used in the 1980 Paris synagogue bombing.

In 1983, 307 people were killed after a truck bomb filled with PETN was detonated at the Beirut barracks.

In 1999, Alfred Heinz Reumayr used PETN as the main charge for his fourteen improvised explosive devices that he constructed in a thwarted attempt to damage the Trans-Alaska Pipeline System.

In 2001, al-Qaeda member Richard Reid, the "Shoe Bomber", used PETN in the sole of his shoe in his unsuccessful attempt to blow up American Airlines Flight 63 from Paris to Miami. He had intended to use the solid triacetone triperoxide (TATP) as a detonator.

In 2009, PETN was used in an attempt by al-Qaeda in the Arabian Peninsula to murder the Saudi Arabian Deputy Minister of Interior Prince Muhammad bin Nayef, by Saudi suicide bomber Abdullah Hassan al Asiri. The target survived and the bomber died in the blast. The PETN was hidden in the bomber's rectum, which security experts described as a novel technique.

On 25 December 2009, PETN was found in the underwear of Umar Farouk Abdulmutallab, the "Underwear bomber", a Nigerian with links to al-Qaeda in the Arabian Peninsula. According to US law enforcement officials, he had attempted to blow up Northwest Airlines Flight 253 while approaching Detroit from Amsterdam.

In the al-Qaeda in the Arabian Peninsula October 2010 cargo plane bomb plot, two PETN-filled printer cartridges were found at East Midlands Airport and in Dubai on flights bound for the US on an intelligence tip. Both packages contained sophisticated bombs concealed in computer printer cartridges filled with PETN. The bomb found in England contained  of PETN, and the one found in Dubai contained  of PETN. Hans Michels, professor of safety engineering at University College London, told a newspaper that  of PETN—"around 50 times less than was used—would be enough to blast a hole in a metal plate twice the thickness of an aircraft's skin". In contrast, according to an experiment conducted by a BBC documentary team designed to simulate Abdulmutallab's Christmas Day bombing, using a Boeing 747 plane, even 80 grams of PETN was not sufficient to materially damage the fuselage.

On 12 July 2017, 150 grams of PETN was found in the Assembly of Uttar Pradesh, India's most populous state.

Detection
In the wake of terrorist PETN bomb plots, an article in Scientific American noted PETN is difficult to detect because it does not readily vaporize into the surrounding air. The Los Angeles Times noted in November 2010 that PETN's low vapor pressure makes it difficult for bomb-sniffing dogs to detect.

Many technologies can be used to detect PETN, including chemical sensors, X-rays, infrared, microwaves and terahertz, some of which have been implemented in public screening applications, primarily for air travel. PETN is one of the explosive chemicals typically of interest in that area, and it belongs to a family of common nitrate-based explosive chemicals which can often be detected by the same tests.

One detection system in use at airports involves analysis of swab samples obtained from passengers and their baggage. Whole-body imaging scanners that use radio-frequency electromagnetic waves, low-intensity X-rays, or T-rays of terahertz frequency that can detect objects hidden under clothing are not widely used because of cost, concerns about the resulting traveler delays, and privacy concerns.

Both parcels in the 2010 cargo plane bomb plot were x-rayed without the bombs being spotted. Qatar Airways said the PETN bomb "could not be detected by x-ray screening or trained sniffer dogs". The Bundeskriminalamt received copies of the Dubai x-rays, and an investigator said German staff would not have identified the bomb either. New airport security procedures followed in the U.S., largely to protect against PETN.

Medical use
Like nitroglycerin (glyceryl trinitrate) and other nitrates, PETN is also used medically as a vasodilator in the treatment of heart conditions. These drugs work by releasing the signaling gas nitric oxide in the body. The heart medicine Lentonitrat is nearly pure PETN.

Monitoring of oral usage of the drug by patients has been performed by determination of plasma levels of several of its hydrolysis products, pentaerythritol dinitrate, pentaerythritol mononitrate and pentaerythritol, in plasma using gas chromatography-mass spectrometry.

See also
 Erythritol tetranitrate
 RE factor

References

Further reading

 

Nitrate esters
Antianginals
Explosive chemicals
German inventions